Justin Christopher Jones (born November 19, 1974) is an American attorney and politician. He is currently the Clark County Commissioner for District F since 2019 and served as a member of the Nevada Senate for the 9th district from 2012 to 2014. He is a member of the Democratic Party.

Biography
Jones was born in Granada Hills, California and grew up in California and Utah. Jones served a service mission for the Church of Jesus Christ of Latter-day Saints in Guatemala. He received his undergraduate degree in Political Science from Brigham Young University and his J.D. degree from George Washington University Law School. After law school, Jones served as a law clerk to U.S. District Court Judge Roger L. Hunt before going into private practice as an attorney in Las Vegas. Jones is currently a partner with the law firm of Jones Lovelock. Jones provides pro bono representation for child victims of domestic abuse and neglect through the Legal Aid Center of Southern Nevada. Justin has also served as counsel for Save Red Rock in its lengthy fight to prevent sprawl development in Red Rock Canyon. Justin has served on several community boards, including the United Way of Southern Nevada, Volunteer Center of Southern Nevada (past Chair), Nevadans for Background Checks, Battle Born Progress (past President), and Emerge Nevada.

Jones is married to Las Vegas native Megan Krausman. Justin and Megan have two children, Gabby and Liam.

Political career
Jones ran for the Nevada Senate in 2012. He defeated Fred Conquest in the Democratic primary in June 2012 by a margin of 82.5% to 17.5%. He defeated Mari Nakashima St. Martin in the general election on November 6, 2012 by 301 votes. During the 2013 legislative session, Jones served as Assistant Majority Whip, Chair of the Senate Health and Human Services Committee, and on the Judiciary and Commerce and Labor Committees.

Jones was defeated by Becky Harris in 2014.

Jones previously ran unsuccessfully in 2004 for the Nevada Assembly against Chad Christensen.

On May 22, 2017, Jones announced that he is running as a Democratic candidate for Clark County Commission, District F in 2018.

Controversies

Representation of Las Vegas Sands Corp.

In October 2010 the Las Vegas Sands Corp. was brought into a lawsuit alleging that the company wrongfully terminated Sands China CEO Steven Jacobs. During a June 2012 court proceeding, information became available that Las Vegas Sands Corp. had access to a computer hard drive containing over 100,000 emails that provided evidence of Jacobs unlawful termination. Las Vegas Sands Corp insisted that this hard drive was located in Macau, and was therefore unable to be used as evidence due to the Personal Data Protection Act laws of the country. In September 2012, Justin Jones testified in court that he and other lawyers of Las Vegas Sands Corp. had in fact reviewed the emails while located in Las Vegas at the time. When asked by a prosecuting attorney what actions he took in court when the defendant Las Vegas Sands Corp. insisted the files were inaccessible, Jones responded, "I did nothing."

Jones was not named in the District Court Judge's reprimand of Las Vegas Sands Corp.

Clark County Commission Lawsuit 2019
Jones has been accused by mining company Gypsum Resources LLC of misleading the state ethics commission, engaging with the County and its leaders in "governmental misconduct", as well as influencing political support for Nevada Governor Steve Sisolak in exchange for “political favors.” Both Jones, and Sisolak reject these claims with Sisolak pointing to prior statements to demonstrate that his position on the matter was unchanged. The original proposal, which was announced in 2003, detailed a plan to develop 5,500 residential homes on a piece of property named Blue Diamond Hill overlooking the Red Rock Canyon National Conservation Area. In response to this plan, the Clark County Commission created a zoning ordinance for the area, limiting the amount of development allowed. Gypsum Resources LLC owner Jim Rhodes sued the commission and the federal court ruled in the developer’s favor. In 2011 Gypsum Resources was approved to develop 7,000 residential homes on Blue Diamond Hill – 1,500 more than previously proposed, contingent upon the acquisition of a federal roads permit. This ignited opposition from the nonprofit activist group Save Red Rock, and after outspoken public forums, and the developer's failure to obtain a federal roads permit, the Commission voted to deny Gypsum Resources’ request for a waiver to continue without one. In July 2019, after multiple failed attempts to develop Blue Diamond Hill, Gypsum Resources LLC filed for bankruptcy. In May of that year, Gypsum Resources opened a lawsuit against Clark County and its commissioners, alleging that elected officials “violated the right to due process” and “failed to act in good faith when reviewing paperwork related to the project”, resulting in financial damages which they claim to have caused the bankruptcy. Additionally, the lawsuit challenges Jones' ability to vote on Gypsum Resources related proposals. Gypsum has also accused Jones of destroying evidence by deleting text messages from his phone related to the company's development.
.

References

External links
 Senate biography

1974 births
Living people
Brigham Young University alumni
George Washington University Law School alumni
Latter Day Saints from Nevada
Democratic Party Nevada state senators
Politicians from Carson City, Nevada
Politicians from Las Vegas
Politicians from Los Angeles